SS Charles Bulfinch was a Liberty ship built in the United States during World War II. She was named after Charles Bulfinch, an American architect. Bulfinch is best known for his designs of the Massachusetts State House, and the wings and central portion of the US Capitol.

Construction
 Charles Bulfinch was laid down on 14 May 1943, under a Maritime Commission (MARCOM) contract, MCE hull 999, by the Bethlehem-Fairfield Shipyard, Baltimore, Maryland; she was sponsored by Mrs. Milton G. Baker, the wife of a yard employee, and was launched on 10 June 1943.

History
She was allocated to Luckenbach Steamship Company, on 22 June 1943. On 10 January 1948, she was laid up in the Hudson River Reserve Fleet, Jones Point, New York. On 4 May 1953, she was withdrawn from the fleet to be loaded with grain under the "Grain Program 1953", she returned loaded on 18 May 1953. On 25 November 1957, she was withdrawn from the fleet to be emptied of grain, she returned empty on 2 December 1957. On 10 October 1958, she was withdrawn from the fleet to be loaded with grain under the "Grain Program 1958", she returned loaded on 27 October 1958. On 19 October 1959, she was withdrawn from the fleet to be emptied of grain, she returned empty on 23 October 1959. On 15 November 1960, she was withdrawn from the fleet to be loaded with grain under the "Grain Program 1960", she returned loaded on 25 November 1960. On 8 March 1963, she was withdrawn from the fleet to be emptied of grain, she returned empty on 14 March 1963. On 7 January 1970, she was sold for scrapping to Steel Factors, Ltd., for $65,130. She was removed from the fleet on 1 May 1970.

References

Bibliography

 
 
 
 

 

Liberty ships
Ships built in Baltimore
1943 ships
Hudson River Reserve Fleet
Hudson River Reserve Fleet Grain Program